Maung Maung (11 January 1925 – 2 July 1994) was the seventh president of Burma, and a well-known writer.

Early life and career
Maung Maung was born on 11 January 1925 in Mandalay, Upper Burma, British Burma. He is the son of lawyer U Sint and his wife Aye Tin. He graduated from BTN High School. He attended the fourth intake of the Japan Academy. In 1946, he received the degree of Bachelor of Arts from Rangoon University. In 1949, he received a Bachelor of Law (BL) degree. He was a lecturer in the English department in Rangoon University, editor of the Burma Khit Newspaper, and Assistant Secretary of Burma Railways. In 1950, he received a scholarship to study in the UK. He entered the Lawyers' Association opened in Lincoln Guest House, Hague. He attended the international Law education school there. He received his LLD from Utrecht University in the Netherlands in June 1956. He temporarily relocated to the United States, as a Visiting Lecturer in Political Science and Southeast Asian Studies at Yale University, with his family. During his stay in Yale, he earned a doctorate in juridical science (JSD), on 11 June 1962.

Political office

Maung Maung served in a legal capacity in General Ne Win's caretaker government from 1958 to 1960. Following Ne Win's 1962 military coup, Maung Maung became Chief Justice and, although a civilian, was a prominent member of the central committee of the BSPP. He played a large part in shaping the 1974 constitution and subsequent changes to the judicial system. On 19 August 1988, amidst a series of large-scale demonstrations, the People's Assembly declared Maung Maung President and BSPP Chairman. Anti-government demonstrations continued and widespread disruptions resulted in another military coup led by Saw Maung on 17 September 1988. After his brief spell in power in 1988, Maung Maung disappeared from the public eye, although it was rumoured that he helped draft the election law governing the 1990 general election. He also served in various capacities in the successive governments of Myanmar as Attorney-General, Supreme Judge-General and other positions.

Publications
Among Maung's well-known publications are:
London Diary (1958)
The Forgotten Army (1946)
Burma in the Family of Nations
General Ne Win and Myanmar Politics (Won the National Literary Award in Politics)
Thet-shi-yar-za-win (Living History—Books on Biography of Statesmen)
To a soldier son
The 1988 Uprising in Burma

Family 
Maung died of a heart attack in Rangoon on 2 July 1994, aged 69.

He had seven children with his wife, Khin May Hnin (aka) Khin Myint. One of his sons, former Brig-Gen of LID 22, Kyaw Thu (Retd.) held the post of Deputy Foreign Minister on the SPDC, from late 2004 to February 2009 and served as chairman of the Union Civil Service Board from February 2009 to March 2016. Prior to those positions, he served as Myanmar Ambassador to South Africa from 1999 to 2002 and Myanmar Ambassador to India from 2002 to 2004.

One of his daughters, Yin Yin Oo became a member to the Advisory Board of State Administration Council (SAC) after the 2021 Myanmar coup d'état.

References

|-

 
|-

1994 deaths
Presidents of Myanmar
1925 births
Burma Socialist Programme Party politicians
Burmese judges
University of Yangon alumni
Utrecht University alumni
Yale University alumni
Defence Services Academy alumni
People from Mandalay